This is a list of winners and nominees for the Nickelodeon Kids' Choice Award for Favorite TV Show, given at the Nickelodeon Kids' Choice Awards. From 2015 until 2017, the category was split into kids and family, and in 2019 into comedy and drama.

Winners and nominees

Programs with multiple awards

4 awards
Home Improvement (consecutive)

3 awards
iCarly (consecutive)
All That (2 consecutive)
Stranger Things (2 consecutive)

2 awards
American Idol
The Cosby Show (consecutive)
Drake & Josh
Lizzie McGuire (consecutive)
Victorious (consecutive)
Henry Danger

Programs with multiple nominations

7 nominations 
The Flash

6 nominations
The Big Bang Theory
iCarly

5 nominations
All That
The Fresh Prince of Bel-Air
Henry Danger
Home Improvement

4 nominations
Drake & Josh
Fear Factor
Friends
Lizzie McGuire
Raven's Home
Stranger Things
Wizards of Waverly Place

3 nominations
Agents of S.H.I.E.L.D.
American Idol
Fuller House
Good Luck Charlie
Growing Pains
Jessie
Sabrina the Teenage Witch
The Cosby Show
The Suite Life of Zack & Cody
The Thundermans
Young Sheldon

2 nominations
ALF
Are You Afraid of the Dark?
Austin & Ally
Black-ish
Boy Meets World
Buffy the Vampire Slayer
Bunk'd
Cobra Kai
Girl Meets World
Hannah Montana
High School Musical: The Musical: The Series
In Living Color
Once Upon a Time
Martin
Modern Family
Sister, Sister
The Suite Life on Deck
Victorious

References

Favorite TV Show